Georgije Branković (1830–1907) was the Patriarch of Karlovci, the spiritual leader of Habsburg Serbs, from 1890 until his death in 1907. He instigated a number of significant religious, educational, and economic reforms within  territories covered by the Patriarchate, and was a renowned patron of the arts.

Biography
A painting called Migration of the Serbs was commissioned by Patriarch Georgije for the 1896 Budapest Millennium Exhibition, marking a thousand years of the Hungarian Empire and reaffirming that country's territorial rights. Prompted by patriotism and contemporary politics, Patriarch Georgije convinced painter Paja Jovanović to present the case for the legitimacy of the Serbian historical presence and territorial claims and, as a consequence, contemporary acceptance of the "legal and privileged position of the Serbs in the Austrian monarchy". The Serbian understanding was that their migration was in response to Leopold I, Holy Roman Emperor's request for their assistance in protecting his borders against the Turks. The contemporary message was that this was the genesis of the Serbian presence in the border areas now under Austria-Hungary.

References

Sources
 

1830 births
1907 deaths
Patriarchs of the Serbian Orthodox Church